Muanpair Panaboot (born January 1, 1988) is a Thai pop singer who released her debut album in 2009. She is also known as Ging the Star. She was fourth in The Star 5, a popular reality show in Thailand in 2009.

Biography
Muanpair was born in Bangkok. She auditioned for The Star 5 in 2009 and landed a spot as one of the final eight contestants and was fourth in the reality show.

Discography

Singles
 Mai Roo
 Mee Tae Kid Teung
 Kon Mai Chai Tum A-Rai Kor Pit
 Pit Pror Rak (Ost. Ching Chang)
 Kor Trot Laew Hai Cheap Mai

Concerts
 The Star 5

Magazine Shooting
 Sut Sup Da
 Volume Magazine
 Kazz

Host
 Entertainment Update

See also
 The Star
 GMM Grammy

External links
 Official Website
 Hi5
 Facebook
 Multiply
 Twitter

1988 births
Living people
Muanpair Panaboot
Muanpair Panaboot
Muanpair Panaboot
Muanpair Panaboot